Euryglossa is a genus of bees belonging to the family Colletidae.

The species of this genus are found in Australia, in all states and territories.

Species:

Euryglossa adelaidae 
Euryglossa alincia 
Euryglossa angelesi 
Euryglossa antennata 
Euryglossa aureopilosa 
Euryglossa calaina 
Euryglossa capitata 
Euryglossa cupreochalybea 
Euryglossa depressa 
Euryglossa edwardsii 
Euryglossa ephippiata 
Euryglossa frenchii 
Euryglossa glabra 
Euryglossa grisea 
Euryglossa haematura 
Euryglossa hardyi 
Euryglossa homora 
Euryglossa jucunda 
Euryglossa laevigatum 
Euryglossa limata 
Euryglossa liopa 
Euryglossa millstreamensis 
Euryglossa myrrhina 
Euryglossa nigrocaerulea 
Euryglossa noosae 
Euryglossa pammicta 
Euryglossa pavonura 
Euryglossa politifrons 
Euryglossa rhodochlora 
Euryglossa rubricata 
Euryglossa salaris 
Euryglossa schomburgki 
Euryglossa subfusa 
Euryglossa subsericea 
Euryglossa terminata 
Euryglossa tolgae 
Euryglossa trichoda 
Euryglossa victoriae

References

Colletidae